An all-wheel drive vehicle (AWD vehicle) is one with a powertrain capable of providing power to all its wheels, whether full-time or on-demand.

The most common forms of all-wheel drive are:
1x1  All unicycles Reflecting one axle with one wheel capable of being powered. 
2x2  Some motorcycles and bikes Reflecting two axles with one wheel on each capable of being powered. 
4×4 (also, four-wheel drive and 4WD) Reflecting two axles with both wheels on each capable of being powered. 
6×6 (also, six-wheel drive and 6WD) Reflecting three axles with both wheels on each capable of being powered.
8×8 (also, eight-wheel drive and 8WD) Reflecting four axles with both wheels on each capable of being powered.

Vehicles may be either part-time all-wheel drive or full-time:
On-demand (also, part-time) One axle is permanently connected to the drive, the other is being connected as needed 
Full-time (also, permanent) All axles are permanently connected, with or without a differential.
Independent  The wheels are driven, but not dependent on a central mechanical power coupling.

Usage of the terminology
Particularly in North America for several decades, the designation AWD has been used and marketed - distinctly from "4X4" and "4WD" - to apply to vehicles with drive train systems that have permanent drive, a differential between the front and rear drive shafts, and active management of torque transfer, especially following the advent of ABS.  However, the designations AWD and all-wheel drive long predated the trend, with Associated Equipment Company (AEC) producing AWD trucks in 1929 in conjunction with the British subsidiary of the pioneering American firm, Four Wheel Drive Auto Company.  Additionally, General Motors began manufacturing a line as "all-wheel drive" as early as the late 1930s.  This distinction in terminology is not generally used outside North America.

Characteristics

When tire grip is good during road driving, a differential is used between the axles to avoid driveline windup. This is not required off-road, as the limited grip allows the tires to slip. All-wheel drive vehicles designed for extensive off-road use may not have such a differential, and so they suffer from wind-up when used on-road. Selectable 4WD also avoids this problem and requires only a simple dog clutch in the transfer case, rather than a differential. For this reason, most early off-road vehicles used that system; e.g., Jeep, Land Rover.

As vehicles became more sophisticated and tires gave better winter performance in the 1960s there was an interest in giving the benefits of all-wheel drive to conventional cars; not for off-road use but for winter use in snow or on wet roads. Exotic vehicles such as the high-powered Jensen FF followed by the AMC Eagle, Subaru Leone and Audi Quattro series were the first to offer all-wheel drive in a high-speed road-based car. These, particularly the Quattro, would extensively develop this drivetrain with the use of viscous couplings and differentials to provide a safe and drivable car. The first off-road / on-road hybrids such as the Range Rover also chose the permanent all wheel drive system rather than manual selection.

Selectable 4WD has both axles rigidly coupled together, which has some advantages in very poor off-road conditions. To gain the same advantage in a permanent AWD system with a differential, the differential can be locked manually with a differential lock. As this control is frequently misunderstood and mis-used, which can then cause damage due to wind-up, they have tended to be replaced by automatic locking through the viscous couplers.

See also

All-terrain vehicle
Four Wheel Drive or FWD, one of the first companies, from 1909, to build four-wheel drive vehicles.
Front-wheel drive
 H-drive
Individual wheel drive
Rear-wheel drive
Two-wheel drive

References 

Off-road vehicles
Car layouts
Drivetrain